The 1978–79 Iran Football's 2nd Division was not completed due to disruptions caused by the Iranian Revolution.

League standings

Group 1

Group 2

See also 
 1978–79 Takht Jamshid Cup

References

League 2 (Iran) seasons
Iran
2